Japanese, Burmese, Tibetan, Indian, Nepalese, Bhutanese, Chakma, Marma and Barua festivals often show the influence of Buddhist culture. Pagoda festivals in Myanmar are one example. In Tibet, India and Bhutan these festivals may include the traditional cham dance.

Lunar New Year festivals of Buddhist countries in east, south and southeast Asia also include some aspects of Buddhist culture, but they are considered cultural festivals as opposed to religious ones.

A
 Aluth Sahal Mangallaya
 Ambedkar Jayanti
 Asalha Puja
 Vesak

B
 Barua festivals
 Bhumchu
 Bodhi Day
 Bon Festival
 Boun Suang Huea
 Buddha's Birthday
 Bunga Dyah Jatra

C
 Chak phra
 Cheung Chau Bun Festival
 Chotrul Duchen

D
 Diwali
 Dongzhi Festival
 Deezezazu

F
 Festival of Floral Offerings

G
 Ghost Festival
 Gozan no Okuribi
 Gunla
 Gunla Bajan
 Guru Purnima

H
 Hari-Kuyo
 Hungry ghost

J
 Jana Baha Dyah Jatra

K
 Kagyed
 Kandy Esala Perahera
 Kathina

L
 Lhabab Duchen 
 Liberation Rite of Water and Land
 Loi Krathong

M
 Madhu Purnima
 Magha Puja
 Mid-Autumn Festival
 Mohani
 Monlam Prayer Festival

O
 Ōmisoka

P
 Pagoda festival
 Parinirvana Day
 Pavarana
 Phi Ta Khon
 Poy Sang Long
 Poson

Q
 Qing Shan King Sacrificial Ceremony
 Qingming Festival

R
 Rocket Festival

S
 Sambuddhatva jayanthi 
 Samyak 
 Sanghamitta
 Sangrai (New year Water Festival Celebrated by Marma and Rakhine People in Bangladesh)
 Sanja Matsuri
 Setsubun
 Songkran
 Songkran (Lao)
 Songkran (Thailand)
 Swanti (festival)

T
 Tak Bat Thewo
 Tango no sekku
 Tazaungdaing festival
 Tết
 Thadingyut Festival
 Thingyan
 Tibetan festivals
 Torgya
 Tshechu

U
 Ubon Ratchathani Candle Festival
 Uposatha

V
 Vassa
 Vesak

W
 Wacho (Start of Rain Retreat by Marma People and Rakhine People)
 Wan Ok Phansa
 Wagyowai (End of Rain Retreat by Marma People and Rakhine People)
 Water-Sprinkling Festival

Y
 Yenya
 Yeongsanjae

See also 
 Buddhist holidays
 Buddhist calendar
 Culture of Buddhism
 Religious festival

 
Festivals
Buddhist Festivals
Buddhist
Buddhist Festivals